Bharathi is a 2000 Indian Tamil-language biographical film based on the life of Subramania Bharati starring Sayaji Shinde, Devayani and Nizhalgal Ravi. The film was directed by Gnana Rajasekaran and won the National Film Award for Best Feature Film in Tamil for the year 2000.

Plot
It is a biographical film based on the life of Tamil poet Subramania Bharati.

Cast

 Sayaji Shinde as Subramania Bharathi
 Pushpaak Ramesh as Childhood Subramania Bharathi
 Devayani as Chellamal
 Ramesh Kumar as Subramania Bharathi's friend
 Nizhalgal Ravi as S. P. Y. Surendranath Arya
 T. P. Gajendran as Kuvalai
 Srikanth
 Junior Balaiah 
 Delhi Kumar
 Bala Singh
 Ganesh Babu as Bharathi's son-in-law

Production
Gnana Rajasekaran had initially wanted to cast Kamal Haasan in the lead role, but the film's budget did not allow it. So he chose Marathi actor Sayaji Shinde, who made his debut in Tamil films.

The female lead role was initially offered to actress Suvalakshmi, whose refusal prompted the team to sign on Devayani.

Soundtrack

Reception
Malathi Rangarajan of The Hindu said, "THE MAJESTIC GAIT, the intimidating, piercing eyes that sparkle with a mix of eccentricity, anger, defiance and passion – Shayaji Shinde is indeed a remarkable choice for the role of Bharati" and "It is another fantastic break for Devyani as Chellamma, the wife of Subramania Bharati. Her soft, vulnerable docility and her helpless effete submission to her husband's impractical way of life have been beautifully portrayed". Rediff said, "Sayaji Shinde as Bharati is simply splendid. His is an impressive performance, with nary an inkling of the trepidation that he is enacting Bharati's role -- he, a Maharashtrian and Tamil, an alien tongue". Thiraipadam.com said, "This is a good biography, but in the end, it seems like it's more a collection of stories than a continuous film. Which is unfortunate because the film had great potential to be absolutely stunningly excellent".

See also
 Kamaraj (2004 film)
 Periyar (2007 film)

References

External links

2000 films
Indian biographical drama films
Films scored by Ilaiyaraaja
2000s Tamil-language films
2000 biographical drama films
Films whose production designer won the Best Production Design National Film Award
Films that won the Best Costume Design National Film Award
Best Tamil Feature Film National Film Award winners
2000 drama films
Films directed by Gnana Rajasekaran